The Open Medellín is a professional tennis tournament played on outdoor clay courts.

The event was classified as a $10,000 ITF Women's Circuit tournament and an ATP Challenger event. The event was held in Medellín, Colombia, from 2004 to 2017 for ATP and from 2014 to 2015 for ITF. From 2006, the event was part of the ATP Challenger Tour, and prior to that, in 2004–05, part of the ITF Men's Circuit. Its last edition had been in 2017. 4 years later, Medellín got back in the ITF route in 2021, classified as a $25,000 tournament for both men and women.

Past finals

Men's singles

Women's singles

Men's doubles

Women's doubles

References

External links 
 Official website of Seguros Bolívar Tennis  (archived)

 
ATP Challenger Tour
ITF Women's World Tennis Tour
Clay court tennis tournaments
Tennis tournaments in Colombia
Recurring sporting events established in 2004